Tahraband (also Romanized as Ţahrāband) is a village in Almalu Rural District, Nazarkahrizi District, Hashtrud County, East Azerbaijan Province, Iran. At the 2006 census, its population was 137, in 19 families.

References 

Towns and villages in Hashtrud County